Ganboldyn Kherlen ( born 24 February 1992) is a Mongolian judoka.

He is the 2017 Judo World Masters champion in the –66 kg, defeating Yeldos Zhumakanov in the final.

At the start of the 2016 Judo Grand Slam Tokyo, he has switched from the –60 kg to the –66 kg with continuing success.

He won one of the bronze medals in his event at the 2022 Judo Grand Slam Tel Aviv held in Tel Aviv, Israel.

References

External links
 
 

1992 births
Living people
Mongolian male judoka
21st-century Mongolian people